The Nations Cup is a yachting match racing competition run by the International Sailing Federation (ISAF) since 1991. It a "global championship to find the world's top match racing nations in open and women's events".

Typically, the boats are supplied by the event organizers, with sailors being randomly assigned boats each day, or swapping between matches.

Nations Cup Grand Final events have been held:

 1991 Barcelona, Spain
 1993 Hoorn, the Netherlands
 1995 San Francisco, USA 
 2006 Crosshaven, Ireland
 2009 Porto Alegre, Brazil
 2011 Sheboygan, USA
 2013 Middelfart, Denmark
 2015 Vladivostok, Russia
 2019 San Francisco, USA

References

Yachting races
Match racing competitions